014 may refer to:

 Argus As 014
 014 Construction Unit
 Divi Divi Air Flight 014
 Pirna 014
 Tyrrell 014

See also
 14 (disambiguation)